William Dutton Hayward (August 31, 1815 – July 10, 1891) was the founder and namesake of the city of Hayward, California.

Early life

William grew up on his father’s farm where he was born, near Hopkinton, Massachusetts. In 1836 he proceeded to Georgetown, Massachusetts, and finding employment in a shoe factory there, remained about ten years.  Also in 1836, William married Louisa Bartlett (born Lois-White Bartlett).  Their daughter Sarah Louise Hayward was born in 1838. Louisa died in 1840.

California Gold Rush

Learning of the 1848 finding of gold in California, Hayward booked passage on the steamer Unicorn which  set sail on April 23, 1849,  steamed through the Strait of Magellan, and arrived in San Francisco on August 31, 1849. Proceeding to the gold fields, he "mined as long as his money lasted" and then returned to the San Francisco Bay Area, a disappointed gold seeker.

For a while, William squatted on Guillermo Castro's ranch, in Palomares Canyon. Castro tried to evict him, but William persuaded him otherwise by making him a pair of boots. His stubbornness and shoe-making ability convinced Castro to hire him.

William set up a small store and saved up enough money to buy  of Castro's land including what is now the downtown Hayward area.  On this land, he established a store and a small dairy operation. This land was along the road that ran from San Jose to Oakland (now called Mission Boulevard in the portion through Hayward and southward).

Castro emigrated to Chile with most of his family in 1864, after he lost his land in a card game. His ranch was split up and sold to various locals, William among them. He constructed a resort hotel on what is now the northeast corner of Main and A Streets, which eventually grew to a hundred rooms. The surrounding area came to be called "Haywards" after William's hotel which bore the name "Haywards Hotel" (no apostrophe before the "s").

Haywards Hotel

Haywards Hotel became a destination for travelers and tourists. It grew to be four stories. Inside the grand building was a large lobby, reception rooms, dining halls, and sitting and card rooms. The hotel also served as a post office. The main force behind the success of Haywards Hotel wasn't William Hayward, but his wife Rachel, who arranged and managed parties, receptions, picnics, rides, and entertainment for guests. The hotel was destroyed by fire in 1923.

Town of Haywards

William then became the road commissioner for Alameda County. He used his authority to influence the construction of roads in his own favor. In 1876, the town was chartered under the name of "Haywards". However, it was not legal to name a post office after a living person, so the official name was "Haywood".   In 1876, "Haywood" was incorporated as the "Town of Haywards", with a population of 1,100.

William served two terms on the Alameda County Board of Supervisors.

On April 5, 1866, William married Mrs. Rachel Rhodes Bedford, a widow, in Haywards. Rachel had a daughter from her first marriage, Mary E. Bedford (b. Feb. 1852). William and Rachel had one child together, William Martin Hayward.

William Hayward died at age 75, as a result of skin cancer, at Haywards Hotel, and was buried in Lone Tree Cemetery in Fairview, near Hayward. According to his tombstone, William died on July 10, 1891.  Also buried there, according to the tombstone, were "Rachel H. Hayward" described as "Mother of Hayward" (presumably meaning the city's mother, not William's mother) who died at age 86, William Martin Hayward the "only son of William and Rachel Hayward" who died on November 20, 1893 "aged 26 years 8 months 14 days", and Sarah Louise Hayward (1838-1909), William's daughter by his first wife.

City of Hayward

In 1894, the "s" in "Haywards" was dropped and on September 18, 1928, the city's name was changed to the "City of Hayward."

References

External links 
 http://www.calarchives4u.com/history/alameda/alameda-chapter-21.txt The Smaller Cities and Towns, Alameda County History (Chapter 21 of Past and Present of Alameda County California—Joseph Baker, Editor, Volume I, Illustrated. Published in Chicago by the S. J. Clarke Publishing Company, 1914)
 https://web.archive.org/web/20071007035417/http://www.calarchives4u.com/Biographies/alameda/alam-hayw.htm1883 biography of William Hayward from the History of Alameda County, California
 http://www.haywardareahistory.org/ Hayward Area Historical Society
 http://www.rootsweb.com/~cenfiles/ca/alameda/1870/notes.txt 1870 Federal Census, Alameda County, California - Transcriber's Notes
 http://user.govoutreach.com/hayward/faq.php?cid=10775 Hayward History
 Google Books excerpts (including photos) from book Early Hayward (Images of America) by Robert Phelps and The Hayward Area Historical Society, published in 2004 by Arcadia Publishing
 http://www.tricityvoice.com/articlefiledisplay.php?issue=2007-03-20&file=William%20Hayward.txt—An article William Hayward - City Namesake from the Tri-City Voice, dated March 20, 2007
 Google Books excerpts from book Historic spots in California By Mildred Brooke Hoover and Douglas E. Kyle, published in 2002 (5th Edition) by Stanford University Press.  William Hayward is discussed on p. 16.

Land owners from California
American city founders
History of Hayward, California
People from Hayward, California
1815 births
1891 deaths
County supervisors in California
Burials at Lone Tree Cemetery (Fairview, California)
Government of Hayward, California
People from Georgetown, Massachusetts
19th-century American politicians
19th-century squatters
19th-century American businesspeople